Inquiry is a Canadian current affairs television series which aired on CBC Television from 1960 to 1964.

Premise
Topics for the first two seasons included censorship, the Columbia River Treaty, the isolation of immigrants, the military, nuclear power, politics, pollution, Quebec separatism and taxation. In the third season the series was able to expand its coverage to include international topics, thanks to a 25% increase in the series budget from the CBC. Warner Troyer also emerged as a leading journalistic talent first in writing, then in production of stories, then joining Dunton in interviews.

Davidson Dunton, previously chairman of the CBC, was the first host of this Ottawa-produced series. When Dunton was appointed to the Royal Commission on Bilingualism and Biculturalism in 1963, he was replaced by Laurier LaPierre. Producer Patrick Watson had earlier made an unsuccessful offer to Pierre Trudeau to host Inquiry.

When Inquiry ended in 1964, many core participants in the series joined This Hour Has Seven Days, including LaPierre, Troyer and Watson.

Scheduling
This half-hour series was broadcast for four seasons as follows (Eastern times):

References

External links
 

CBC Television original programming
1960 Canadian television series debuts
1963 Canadian television series endings
Television shows filmed in Ottawa